Hayzouq    is a town in Akkar Governorate, Lebanon.

The population  is mostly  Sunni Muslims.

History
In 1838, Eli Smith noted  the village as Haizuk,  located east of esh-Sheikh Mohammed. The  inhabitants were  Sunni Muslim  and  Greek Orthodox.

References

Bibliography

External links
Hayzouq, Localiban 

Populated places in Akkar District
Eastern Orthodox Christian communities in Lebanon
Sunni Muslim communities in Lebanon